The International Business Times is an American online newspaper that publishes five national editions in four languages. The publication, sometimes called IBTimes or IBT, offers news, opinion and editorial commentary on business and commerce. IBT is one of the world's largest online news sources, receiving forty million unique visitors each month. Its 2013 revenues were around $21 million. As of January 2022, IBTimes editions include Australia, India, International, Singapore, U.K. and U.S.

IBTimes was launched in 2005; it is owned by IBT Media, and was founded by Etienne Uzac and Johnathan Davis. Its headquarters are in the Financial District of Lower Manhattan, New York City.

History

Founder Etienne Uzac, a native of France, came up with the idea for the global business news site while a student at the London School of Economics. He found that the strongest business newspapers had a focus on the United States and Europe and planned to provide broader geographic coverage. Uzac recruited Johnathan Davis to join him in the enterprise. In late 2005, Uzac and Davis moved to New York City to launch the site, with Uzac primarily focused on business strategy, while Davis coded the site and wrote the first articles.

In May 2012, the company announced the appointment of Jeffery Rothfeder, a former national news editor at Bloomberg, as editor-in-chief and the promotion of Davis from executive editor to chief content officer.

On August 4, 2013, IBT Media announced its purchase of Newsweek and the domain newsweek.com from IAC/InterActiveCorp.

Peter S. Goodman, previously executive business editor and global news editor of The Huffington Post, became editor-in-chief in 2014. Goodman left the company in 2016. and was soon replaced by Dayan Candappa, the ex-deputy managing editor of Reuters, as new Editor-in-Chief of IBTimes. From March to July 2016, IBT laid off an estimated thirty percent of its editorial staff. This period marked a new era for the company as it expanded into branded content and events with its sister publication Newsweek. At the same time, Dev Pragad, was brought to the United States from London to be the global CEO of Newsweek and IBT' parent company. This was followed in January 2017 by the appointment of Alan Press in the "newly created, strategic role of President".

Content
In April 2006 the International Business Times made its first foray into the online world with the launch of ibtimes.com. This provided a summary of news from around the globe, which was supplemented in November 2007 with a dedicated Foreign Exchange (Forex) portal, providing 24/7 coverage.
  After 2007 the site underwent several revamps and changes of strategy as the company reacted to changes online, culminating with a design to highlight its journalism and better serve advertisers in 2017.

Ex-journalists told The Guardian in 2014 that at times they seemed to operate more as "content farms" - demanding high-volume output - than a source of quality journalism. At least two journalists were allegedly threatened with firing unless readership to their articles increased sharply.

From 2012, IBTimes won or was nominated  for a series of online media and journalism awards, including best investigative journalism, editor of the year, best video journalism and best writer of the year.

In 2015 IBT was nominated Gerald Loeb Award for distinguished business journalism in the beat reporting around state pension corruption.  The series of reports by the IBT team led New Jersey state government to open a formal pay to play investigation and to divest state holdings in a venture capital firm. The series also led San Francisco officials to delay a proposed $3 billion investment in hedge funds.

In 2016, IBT received four "Best in Business" awards from the Society of American Business Editors and Writers(SABEW), the most of any publication that year. The works included the International Explainer winner "Lebanon's Refugee Economy" which brought new understanding to the economic and human dimensions of the crisis in Syria. An examination of exorbitant fees charged to prisoners, prompted a response by the FCC., while an in-depth series on the business of marijuana  won the Small Business Category.

Goodman said of the time the awards were "validation of our aggressive investment in original reporting and story-telling."

Also 2016, IBT hired John Crowley, the Wall Street Journal's EMEA digital editor, as its UK editor-in-chief. According to The Guardian, "Crowley said his focus would be on helping the site break exclusives, in-depth storytelling and new forms of digital journalism. He said IBT was putting together a UK business desk and hiring an audience team." Crowley stated, "We are not a wire service or so-called paper of record... but I have a vision of where I want to take a site... we've got to have a USP (unique selling proposition)... make ourselves distinctive in journalistic terms."

In early 2017, International Business Times joined a partnership along with the likes of Bloomberg, Channel 4 and the BBC to work together to combat the spread of fake news.

In June 2017, Jason Murdock — who covers cybersecurity for the International Business Times UK — won Digital Writer of the year at the Drum Online Media Awards, which according to InPublishing magazine “identify the cleverest, boldest and most original purveyors of news and views from around the world.”

In 2017, during the buildup to what would be come the Tax Cuts and Jobs Act of 2017, the  International Business Times broke news that a last-minute revision was added to the bill that allowed people who hold real estate holdings through a limited liability company to be able to take advantage of a new deduction for “pass-through” businesses.
 The report noted President Trump and several policy makers stood to benefit from the language. The reporting spread quickly, prompting responses from senators and lawmakers  and subsequently won a SABEW for 2017 Breaking News Category.

In the Columbia Journalism Review, contributing editor Trudy Lieberman credited IBTs David Sirota's investigative reporting for helping to drive a call for reform in Connecticut health insurance regulation.

In October 2017, as media and public frenzy grew around Harvey Weinstein allegations, which in-turn led to national and global movements for the protection of women with #MeToo being the most recognized of them, IBT dropped a bombshell exclusive piece linking Weinstein with the New York District Attorney, Cy Vance. The story was the first to financially connect Vance with Weinstein and elevated subsequent scrutiny around the DA's prosecution record.

Labor relations
Early in its history, IBT Media allegedly employed immigrant students of Olivet University who were not authorized to work in the United States to translate English content into Chinese and other languages, paying them less than minimum wage to do so. In 2016, employees complained publicly about missed payroll, meager or nonexistent severance packages, and one-sided nondisclosure agreements.

Relationship to "The Community"
The nature of the connection between IBT and The Community, a Christian sect led by David Jang, is disputed; IBT states that many reports about its connections to The Community are false or exaggerated.

Davis and Uzac both have ties to Olivet University, an evangelical institution founded by  Jang. Graduates of Olivet are known to work at Newsweek Media Group, which has donated money to Olivet. Davis was formerly on faculty at Olivet, where his wife serves as university president. Uzac has served on the Olivet board of trustees; his wife has worked as press secretary for the World Evangelical Alliance, of which Olivet is a member. Davis has personally endorsed the view that homosexuality can be caused by childhood sexual abuse and cured by therapy, although he declines to elaborate on his religious views regarding homosexuality, stating that he separates his work from his faith.

Christianity Today claimed in 2012 that it had obtained an email in which Davis stated that he could not join a certain Jang-affiliated organization because his "commission is inherently covert". Davis denied the claim.

References

External links
 
 

American financial news websites
Organizations based in New York City
Internet properties established in 2005
IBT Media
2005 establishments in New York City